Stefan Kiesbye is a German novelist and poet. His first novel, Next Door Lived a Girl won the Low Fidelity Press Novella Award. The German edition was a KrimiWelt Top Ten crime novel pick for four consecutive months. The book has also been translated into Dutch, Spanish and Japanese. His second novel, Your House Is on Fire, Your Children All Gone was a Top Ten pick of Oprah Magazine, made Entertainment Weekly’s Must List, and was named one of the best books of 2012 by Slate editor Dan Kois. Kiesbye's stories, essays, and reviews have appeared in The Wall Street Journal, Publishers Weekly, and the LA Times, among others.

Kiesbye earned an MFA in creative writing from the University of Michigan. He currently teaches creative writing at Sonoma State University and is a member of the University of Tampa's MFA Faculty.

Bibliography
2004: Next Door Lived a Girl (novel) Low Fidelity Press. 2012: Your House Is on Fire, Your Children All Gone (novel) Penguin Books. 2014: Messer, Gabel, Schere, Licht ("Knives, Forks, Scissors, Flames") (novel) Klett-Cotta Verlag / Tropen2015: Fluchtpunkt Los Angeles ("Vanishing Point Los Angeles") novel) ars vivendi Verlag2015: The Staked Plains (novel) Saddle Road Press. 2016: Knives, Forks, Scissors, Flames (novel) Panhandler Books. 2017: Cover Stories (anthology) Volt Books. 2018: Berlingeles (novel) Revelore Press. 2022: But I Don't Know You (novel) Saddle Road Press. 2022: No Sound to Break, No Moment Clear (novel) Brighthorse Books.

References

External links
Stefan Kiesbye (Official Author Site)
Your House Is on Fire, Your Children All Gone at Penguin Books
Next Door Lived a Girl at Saddle Road Press
The Staked Plains at Saddle Road Press
Knives, Forks, Scissors, Flames at Panhandler Books
Cover Stories at Volt Books
Berlingeles at Revelore Press
But I Don't Know You at Saddle Road Press
No Sound to Break, No Moment Clear at Brighthorse Books

German poets
21st-century German novelists
Living people
Year of birth missing (living people)
University of Michigan alumni
Place of birth missing (living people)
German male poets
German male novelists
21st-century German male writers